Brigitta Pecanka (born 25 February 1959) is an Austrian field hockey player. She competed in the women's tournament at the 1980 Summer Olympics.

References

External links
 

1959 births
Living people
Austrian female field hockey players
Olympic field hockey players of Austria
Field hockey players at the 1980 Summer Olympics
Field hockey players from Vienna